Emamzadeh Taqi (also Romanized as Emāmzādeh Taqī and Emāmzādehtaqī) is a village in Gasht Rural District, in the Central District of Fuman County, Gilan Province, Iran. At the 2006 census, its population was 450, in 119 families.

References 

Populated places in Fuman County